Glaphyria sesquistrialis, the white-roped glaphyria moth, is a moth in the family Crambidae. It was described by Jacob Hübner in 1823. It is found in Honduras and North America, where it has been recorded from Ontario to Florida and from Illinois to Texas.

The larvae feed on Quercus virginiana.

References

Moths described in 1923
Glaphyriini